Rho GDP-dissociation inhibitor 1 is a protein that in humans is encoded by the ARHGDIA gene.

Interactions 
ARHGDIA has been shown to interact with:

 CDC42, 
 RAC1, 
 RHOA, 
 Rac2, and
 RhoH.

References

External links

Further reading